Mount Alice may refer to:

 Mount Alice (Alaska) in Alaska, USA
 Mount Alice (British Columbia) in British Columbia, Canada
 Mount Alice (California) in California, USA
 Mount Alice (Colorado) in Colorado, USA
 Mount Alice, Falkland Islands in West Falkland, Falkland Islands